Part-Time Work Convention, 1994 is  an International Labour Organization Convention for protection of part-time workers including the rights to equal pay for equal work.

It was established in 1994, with the preamble stating:
Recognizing the importance of productive and freely chosen employment for all workers, the economic importance of part-time work, the need for employment policies to take into account the role of part-time work in facilitating additional employment opportunities, and the need to ensure protection for part-time workers in the areas of access to employment, working conditions and social security, and

Having decided upon the adoption of certain proposals with regard to part-time work,...

Ratifications
As of February 2023, the convention has been ratified by 20 states.

External links 
Text.
Ratifications.

International Labour Organization conventions
Part-time employment
Treaties concluded in 1994
Treaties entered into force in 1998
Treaties of Albania
Treaties of Australia
Treaties of Belgium
Treaties of Bosnia and Herzegovina
Treaties of Cyprus
Treaties of Guyana
Treaties of Finland
Treaties of Hungary
Treaties of Italy
Treaties of Luxembourg
Treaties of Mauritius
Treaties of the Netherlands
Treaties of Portugal
Treaties of Russia
Treaties of Slovenia
Treaties of Sweden
1994 in labor relations